Hugo Bakker (16 June 1985 – 31 May 2021) was a Dutch historian, organist, music publisher and music educator. He also had a Master's degree  as harpsichordist. Bakker won prizes at competitions in Maassluis and in the Italian Pistoia.

He was the founder and owner of the music publishing house Valeur Ajoutée.

Hugo Bakker was the first organist of Netherlands who went into schools with a Do-organ of the Orgelkids movement. 

Bakker died on 31 May 2021, aged 35.

References

External links

Dutch organists
Dutch music educators
1985 births
2021 deaths
People from Gouda, South Holland
Place of death missing